Sree Chirakkakavu Bhagavathi Temple is one of the oldest Devi Temples in North Kerala.  

The presiding deity of this temple is the goddess Kaali, who is worshipped in three forms, or Thrigunaathmika. The temple was built by the king of Kolathiri- Chirakkkal Raja after the swayambhoo of the goddess in Koduvally River, and so became renowned as Sree Chirakkakavu. 

According to established belief, the goddess Kaali appeared in the azhimugham of Vamal with her parivaras(retinue), in the palace where the river meets the sea. She assumed the form of a divine fish. The place is now known as Vamal, the Sree Moolasthana of Sree Chirakkakavu Bhagavathi. 

Chiirakkal Raja visited the palace and bowed to the goddess. The king then built the temple on top of Illikkunnu, believed to be the thapovan of an earlier era. The temple is surrounded by kavu or groves of trees.

Other deities (Upadevathas) 

Guntur Kotta vaanavar, Ilankarumakan and Poothadi are in a single shrine near the temple.
Outside the Nalambalamt there is a Sarppakkavu (Snake Shrine) in the south-west corner of the temple which contains Nagaraja, Nagakanyaka and Chithrkoodam.

Festival 

The temple festival is celebrated every year on days 9-12 of the month of medaom which usually falls on 22 to 25 April. 

On Medom 9th the thantrik poojas and Uthsavabali is observed. In the evening the Uthsalva kolam (Thidambu) is taken out of the temple as Ezhunnallathu by the temple priest. This occasion is the only time where the goddess comes out of the temple in full alankaras in Ulthasava Thidambu.

Theyyam 

This is the next three-day festival. The four manifestations of the goddess, Chorakalathil Bhagavathi, Puthiya Bhagavathi and Cheriya Thampuratty, are the daughters of the mother goddess and Valiya Thampuratty.  Guntoor Kotta vanavan, Ilankarumakan, Poothadi are the other male Theyyams here.  On Medom 10th the Nattathira is celebrated here.  On 11 th Medom Ariyalavu is observed.  This is a practice of giving rice, pulses and coconut oils to the all concerned communities to the kavu.  This custom recalls the riches of bygone times.  

In the olden days, the Temple owned land from Vamla To Kali. In the morning of 11th medom Valaiya Thampuratty visits all devotees in the village (hosuses comes under Anchukandy Parambu) and blesses the devotees. 

Kalasams come from various parts of the villages to make offerings to the devi.  Motha Kalasam and Vaikalasam have the right to enter to the temple first.  By the early hours of 12th Medom the Theyyams start to come to the Thirumuttam in this order: Guntoor Kotta Vanavar, Chorakalathil Bhagavathi and Puthiya bhgagavathi. It is considered a blessing when a few drops of rain sweep through as Chaorakalthil bhagavthi theyyam appears on the courtyard of the temple.  A Mulla Mala (Jasmine garland) is the traditional offering to Chorakkalathil Bhagavathi.

Thirdly comes the Theyaam of Puthiya Bhagavathi (Theethira), The theyaam comes with the fire as ornaments and blesses the devotees.  

By the morning of 12th Medom the theyyam of Ilankarumankan and Poothadi appears on the courtyard of the temple. The theyyam is of divine war between the two.

Then Thampuratty comes out into the courtyard.  The Aattam of Thampuratty with her divine sword is a very rare sight which gives her devotees a life’s blessings. Then the Cheriya Thampuratty appears on the courtyard of the temple with beautiful white hair and other decorations. Then the Thampuratty with Thirumudy and her daughter, Cheriaya Champuratty travel around the temple, followed by the kalasalams and devotees in procession.

Important days of the temple 

Chingam- Uthradam - Nira Aaghosham 
Navarathi- Saraswthi Pooja, Grantha Pooja, Vahana Pooja, Vidhyarambam. 
Dhanu 9- Mandala Pooja- Chuttuvialakku 
Makaram- Prathishta Dinam 
Medom 9-12 Uthsavam- Thira Mahothsavam

Temple timings 

Morning 5:30 Shrine opens, then Abhishekam 
7:00 Usha Pooja 
11:30 Ucha Pooja 
12:30 Temple closes 
Evening 5:00 Temple reopens 
6:00 Deepaaradhana(around dusk) 
7:30 Athazhapooja 
8:00 Shrine Closes. 
Every day At Vamal the Sree Moola Stanam Kalasam is celebrated after the Uchpooja.

Renovation 

The temple structure is believed to be at least 800 yrs old.  The Sreekovil was renovated recently. Punaprathishta was done with Astabandha Kalasam in the year 2000

Religion
Hinduism

Hindu temples in Kannur district

Bhagavathi temples in Kerala